The men's taijiquan / taijijian all-around competition at the 2008 Beijing Wushu Tournament was held from August 21 to 22 at the Olympic Sports Center Gymnasium.

Background 
At the 2007 World Wushu Championships, China's Wu Yanan and Japan's Yoshihiro Shimoda were the gold medalists in the taijiquan and taijijian events respectively. Two other favorites in this event were Taipei's Chang Ching-Kuei who was the silver medalist in taijiquan and Hong Kong's Hei Zhi Hong who placed third in taijijian.

At the competition during the first round of taijijian, Wu quickly set himself apart from the rest of the competition with a 9.90, the highest score ever received at the Beijing Wushu Tournament. He was followed by Hei who distanced himself from Chang by another wide margin. In the second round of taijiquan, Wu and Hei secured their medal positions and Chang received a low score, leaving Shimoda to make a comeback to receive the bronze medal.

Schedule 
All times are Beijing Time (UTC+08:00)

Results 
The taijijian event was judged without the degree of difficulty component while the taijiquan event was judged with it.

References

External Links 

 Official Website

Men's_taijiquan